Typhoon Kaemi, known in the Philippines as Typhoon Glenda, was a typhoon that struck Taiwan and China in 2006. Kaemi killed at least 32 people in China.

Meteorological history 

A tropical depression formed on July 18, 2006, near the Caroline Islands and it quickly strengthened to tropical storm strength the same day. On July 19, the storm was named Kaemi by the JMA in Japan. The correct name Gaemi was submitted by South Korea and is a Korean word for ant (개미). Also, PAGASA named the storm Glenda. It strengthened into a severe tropical storm on July 20, and further deepened into a typhoon 24 hours later. Kaemi made landfall in Jinjiang, Fujian at 3:50 p.m. CST on July 25 as a minimal typhoon. Shortly thereafter, the JTWC issued its final warning about Kaemi, while the AMJ did the same the next day.

Impact 
In Taiwan, heavy rainfall caused flooding and four minor injuries. Also, in the northern Philippines, rain fell heavily. The storm has also killed at least 32 people in China, while another 60 people are missing. Agricultural losses in Taiwan amounted to NT$73 million (US$2.2 million). Total damages from Kaemi amounted to $450 million.

References

See also 
 2006 Pacific typhoon season
 Typhoon Prapiroon (2006)

Typhoons in China
2006 Pacific typhoon season
2006 in China
2006 in Taiwan
Typhoons in Taiwan